Julius Finn (28 April 1871 – 6 December 1931) was an American chess master.

Born into a Jewish family in Władysławow, Lithuania (then Russia), he came to New York City in 1887. From a humble start as a street peddler on the Lower East Side, Finn swiftly rose to become New York's champion chess master and one of the country's best blindfold chess entertainers. Finn's first tournament in America was a Handicap Tournament played in New York's Café Boulevard in 1895 where he was ranked as a 2nd class player at the beginning of the competition. As it happened, he took home the 1st prize ahead of William Ewart Napier, Hermann Helms, and many other well-known players from the local American scene. In July 1897, Finn led a consultation team to victory against the veteran Wilhelm Steinitz in the rooms of the Metropolitan Chess Club.

He won thrice the New York State Championship (1901, 1907, 1908), and won the Rice Gambit tournament at the Manhattan Chess Club in 1903. Finn did engage in two interesting cable games. One with a Cuban team led by José Raúl Capablanca in 1903 and the other was the New York – Berlin Cable Match from 1905 where he played on the third board for New York, drawing his game with Emil Schallopp.

Mr. Finn acted as referee at the World Chess Championship 1921 which was played between Emanuel Lasker and José Raúl Capablanca in Havana. He was one of the organizers of the New York 1924 chess tournament and the president of the 1927 New York Tournament. He also served as adjudicator for the college chess league with which Columbia, Harvard, Yale and Princeton were affiliated. He had been a member of the Manhattan Chess Club and Rutgers Club for many years.

References

External links

Jewish chess players
Polish chess players
American chess players
Lithuanian Jews
American people of Polish-Jewish descent
Polish emigrants to the United States
1871 births
1931 deaths
People from Kudirkos Naumiestis